RC4 can refer to:

RC4 – cipher used for computer data protection
Battle of Route Coloniale 4 – battle during the Vietnam War
Iranian Railways RC4 – Iranian electric locomotive
SJ Rc4 – Swedish electric locomotive